Robin Caspar Walker (born 12 April 1978) is a British politician who has been the Member of Parliament (MP) for Worcester since 2010. He has chaired the House of Commons Education Select Committee since November 2022. He served as the Minister of State for School Standards from 2021 to 2022 and as a Parliamentary Under-Secretary of State at both the Scotland Office and Northern Ireland Office under Prime Minister Boris Johnson from 2019 to 2020. A member of the Conservative Party, he identifies as a one-nation Conservative.

Early life and education

His father was Peter Walker, Baron Walker of Worcester, MP for Worcester from 1961 to 1992 and subsequently member of the House of Lords. Robin Walker was born in London, and was educated at St Paul's School, an independent school for boys in Barnes in West London, followed by a scholarship at Balliol College, Oxford, where he read Ancient and Modern History.

Career
After leaving university, Walker set up his own internet business, before pursuing a career in the City of London with the financial communications company Finsbury.

Walker has campaigned in three elections, working for Secretary of State for Health Stephen Dorrell in 1997, for Richard Adams, the Conservative Candidate for Worcester in 2001, and as press officer for Oliver Letwin, then Shadow Chancellor, in 2005. In the 2010 general election, he defeated incumbent MP Mike Foster to win the Worcester seat, eighteen years after his father retired as a member of parliament for the same constituency (with revised boundaries) and joined the House of Lords.

Parliamentary career
Walker was selected to contest the Worcester constituency in August 2006, in which he was elected in 2010, and then was re elected in the 2015 General Election, defeating Labour challenger Joy Squires.

Since being elected Member of Parliament for Worcester, Walker has campaigned for jobs for local people in Worcester, more and better apprenticeships, fairer funding in education, cutting fuel duty as well as a referendum on the European Union.

Walker was elected to the Business Innovation and Skills Committee in 2012, focusing on apprenticeships, SME (small and medium-sized enterprises) policy and business rates reform to improve opportunities for young people and businesses. He was made Parliamentary Private Secretary (PPS) to Liz Truss, the Secretary of State for Environment, Food and Rural Affairs, in September 2014.

Walker was one of a small group of Conservative MPs who rebelled from the party line and voted in favour of an in/out referendum on Britain's membership of the European Union. He ultimately supported the government's plan to hold a referendum by 2017, and voted against a rebel amendment to hold the referendum in 2014.

Walker has campaigned for fairer funding in education as a member of the cross party F40 campaign, which in 2014 secured an extra £350 million for lower funded areas – £5 million of which is earmarked for Worcestershire.

Walker was made the chairman of the All Party Group for Credit Unions in October 2014. Walker has supported a number of cross party initiatives on making credit unions available in post offices as well as helping them to compete with larger lenders. He had also received the Citizens Advice Parliamentarian of the Year Award earlier in the year, in recognition for his campaign for better regulation of pay day lenders.

In July 2014, Walker called on Prime Minister David Cameron to use "every tool in the box" to de-escalate the violence in Gaza, and bring both sides to the table. Later that year, Walker campaigned for a two-hour train service from Worcester to London, citing benefits to local constituents and businesses. He spoke on this topic during a parliamentary debate in the House of Commons, calling for a "faster and more frequent train service". 

He campaigned for Scotland to remain part of the United Kingdom during the 2014 Scottish independence referendum.

In May 2015, Walker was made PPS to Secretary of State for Education Nicky Morgan and also sat on the House of Commons Select Committee for Administration.

Walker was opposed to Brexit prior to the 2016 referendum. In July 2016, he was appointed as Minister at the Department for Exiting the European Union, in the government led by Theresa May.

In October 2016, Walker formally debated a petition calling for the observance of a British Independence Day in the United Kingdom. Arguing against, he said that "tempting though that might be, I think the idea of an independence day would face fierce competition from the likes of St George's Day, Trafalgar Day and many more."

In February 2023, Walker announced he would be standing down at the next general election.

Personal life
Walker is a long-term supporter of both Worcester RFC "The Worcester Warriors" and the Worcestershire County Cricket Club. He wore the Worcestershire CCC tie whilst delivering his maiden parliamentary speech in the House of Commons. On 9 April 2011, Walker married Charlotte Keenan, former chief executive of the Tony Blair Faith Foundation, currently managing director at Goldman Sachs. Their daughter, Hermione, was born in 2018.

Notes

References

External links

Official website
 Worcester Conservatives

|-

1978 births
Living people
People educated at St Paul's School, London
Alumni of Balliol College, Oxford
Conservative Party (UK) MPs for English constituencies
Members of the Parliament of the United Kingdom for Worcester
Sons of life peers
UK MPs 2010–2015
UK MPs 2015–2017
UK MPs 2017–2019
UK MPs 2019–present